The MATADOR ("man-portable, anti-tank, anti-door") is a  man-portable, disposable anti-armour and anti-brickwall weapon system developed by Germany, Israel and Singapore. It is an updated version of the German Armbrust design, and operates on the same principles. The development of this weapon began in 2000 and the MATADOR will eventually replace the German Armbrust Light Anti-tank Weapon, which has been in service since the 1980s.

The MATADOR was developed jointly by the Singapore Armed Forces (SAF) and the Defence Science and Technology Agency (DSTA), in collaboration with Rafael Advanced Defense Systems and Dynamit Nobel Defence (DND) joint team.

Capabilities
The MATADOR is among the lightest in its class. The warhead is effective against both vehicle armour and brick walls. The weapon has little back-blast, making it safe for operation in confined spaces.

The MATADOR is supposed to be capable of defeating the armour of most known armoured personnel carriers and light tanks in the world.

The MATADOR's projectile is claimed to be insensitive to wind due to its propulsion system, which results in a highly accurate weapon system.

Warhead
The warhead can be used in both high-explosive anti-tank (HEAT) and high explosive squash head (HESH) modes against armour, walls, or other fortifications respectively. Modes are selected by adjusting a probe (most likely a fuse extender): extending it for HEAT mode and leaving it retracted for HESH mode.

Counter-mass system

Similar to the Armbrust, the counter-mass counteracts the recoil of the weapon upon firing. The counter-mass consists of shredded plastic, which is launched out of the rear of the weapon when it is fired. This plastic is rapidly slowed by air resistance, allowing the weapon to be fired safely within an enclosed space. In addition, the positioning of the counter-mass takes into consideration the centre of gravity of the weapon to ensure good balance for better accuracy.

Variants

Variants of the original HEAT/HESH (HH) weapon have been developed by Rafael and Dynamit Nobel Defence, designed primarily for anti-structure use by soldiers operating in dense urban environments.

MATADOR-MP
Multi-purpose weapon with a warhead effective against a wide variety of ground targets, from light armoured vehicles to fortified positions and urban walls. As with the initial MATADOR, this is achieved with a dual-mode fuse, which has been improved on the MATADOR-MP such that it now automatically discriminates between hard and soft targets rather than requiring the operator to manually make the selection. A dedicated targeting device, mounted on its Picatinny rail, incorporates a reflex sight and laser rangefinder to provide a high hit probability.

MATADOR-WB

MATADOR-AS
Anti-structure weapon with an advanced tandem warhead that can also be set between two modes. The anti-emplacement mode uses an enhanced blast effect to defeat structures and fortifications, while the penetrating/mouse-holing mode defeats light armoured vehicles and creates mouseholes in urban walls. MATADOR-AS has been ordered by the British Army, and was slated for service entry in 2009.

RGW
RGW 90 is a German designation for the MATADOR, with "RGW" standing for "recoilless grenade weapon". RGW 60 is a variant that is smaller and fires a 60 mm warhead, instead of the usual 90 mm.

Combat history
The MATADOR saw its first combat deployment in January 2009, by Israel Defence Forces soldiers during Operation Cast Lead in the Gaza Strip. MATADOR-AS was used to breach walls in structures, allowing IDF troops to pass through and attack opponents inside.

In 2022, Ukrainian forces used MATADORs supplied by Germany against Russian forces during the 2022 Russian invasion of Ukraine.

According to reports from Ukraine, the RGW-90 is capable of penetrating lightly armoured APCs and IFVs, but not guaranteed to easily defeat tank reactive armour.

“This summer, the soldiers of the 93rd Brigade fired RGW90 into the forehead of a Russian tank with reactive armor. The tank was not destroyed, but it was stopped, and soldiers who were on the top of the tank got minced,” the military stated.

Operators

: In 2013, made order for 111 RGW90 AS. In January 2022, Belgian Ministry of Defence made a  order for several batches of RGW90, which were to be delivered before the year ends.
: The German Army has ordered 1,000 MATADOR-AS under the name RGW90 AS with scalable anti-structure munition. The German Army also uses the LRMP version (range: 1,200 meters) under the designation "Wirkmittel 90". In late 2020, the German Army ordered 3,000 cartridges in different munition types for the Wirkmittel 90.
: Israel Defense Forces.
: RGW60 variant, first seen in September 2018, 3,000 units approx.
: under the name RGW90
: Replaced the Armbrust in the Singapore Armed Forces.
: Slovenian Ground Force, locally designated as RGW 90.

: The Armed Forces of Ukraine bought 5,100 units with the first batch of 2,650 units received on 26 March 2022, and 2,450 remaining units were to be delivered in smaller batches by the end of May 2022 to support its fight against Russia in the 2022 Russian invasion of Ukraine. 7,944 RGW 90 were donated by Germany.
: British Army has ordered the new Anti-Structures Munition (ASM) version of the MATADOR from Dynamit Nobel Defence.
: Used by the Vietnam People's Navy's Infantry.

Incidents
In December 2022 one was discharged by Polish police general commandant Jaroslaw Szymczyk inside his office at National Police Headquarters.

See also

Alcotán-100
Armbrust
B-300, Israel
Panzerfaust 3
PzF 44

References

External links

Rafael MATADOR
Israeli Weapons

Weapons of Singapore
Weapons of Israel
Anti-tank rockets
Rafael Advanced Defense Systems
Post–Cold War weapons of Germany
Military equipment introduced in the 2000s